Dr. Brent Robinson (1951–1996, born Charles Brent Robinson) was a lecturer at the University of Cambridge and author. He was a Fellow of Hughes Hall, Cambridge, and wrote books such as Microcomputers and the Language of Arts (English, Language and Education), and works relating to information technology use by teachers. He created the Journal of Information Technology For Teacher education, in which he was also a researcher. His major interests were in teacher education, and he was formerly Vice President of the Society for Information Technology and Teacher Education.

His family had a tradition: every male in the family were to be named Charles, as a first name. Brent Robinson, however, preferred to be referred to by his middle name. He produced a number of notable works, such as Education Technology: Leadership Perspective.

Literary research
Literary personification was a key research focus for Dr Robinson. He hired a professional writer to play a character who featured in a novel, and then encouraged eighth grade students to write to this character with questions and comments. This however, was done via email communication. Brent was featured in a Cambridge University publication surrounding IT usage in the classroom, when information technology was just coming into fruition.

Personal life 
Brent was born in Winchester in 1951. He had a daughter named Charlotte. He married Suzanne D Cowling in 1982, however at a later unknown date, he divorced her.

Death 
Robinson died on a Channel ferry on 14 September 1996, according to his family. He was 45.

References 

Fellows of Hughes Hall, Cambridge
1951 births
1996 deaths
20th-century British writers
Academics of the University of Cambridge
20th-century British male writers